George Garfield Nader, Jr. (October 19, 1921 – February 4, 2002) was an American actor and writer. He appeared in a variety of films from 1950 to 1974, including Sins of Jezebel (1953), Congo Crossing (1956), and The Female Animal (1958). During this period, he also did episodic television and starred in several series, including NBC's The Man and the Challenge (1959–60). In the 1960s he made several films in Germany, playing FBI agent Jerry Cotton. He is remembered for his first starring role, in the low-budget 3-D sci-fi film Robot Monster (1953), known as "one of the worst films ever made.”

Discreetly gay during his acting career, he and his life partner Mark Miller were among Rock Hudson's closest friends. After retiring from acting, he wrote Chrome (1978), a science-fiction novel dealing positively with a same-sex relationship.

Early life
Nader was born in Pasadena, California, the son of Alice (née Scott), who was from Kansas, and George Garfield Nader, who was from Illinois. He earned his Bachelor of Arts in theater arts at Occidental College.

During World War II he served in the US Navy as a communications officer in the Pacific theater from 1943 to 1946.

Early career
Nader began his acting career in 1950. He appeared in several productions at the Pasadena Playhouse over four years, which led to a number of bit parts in films. He was in Rustlers on Horseback (1950) for Republic Pictures while also appearing on stage in Summer and Smoke at the Pasadena Playhouse.

He had small parts in You're in the Navy Now (1951), The Prowler (1951), Take Care of My Little Girl (1951), The Desert Fox: The Story of Rommel (1951), and Two Tickets to Broadway (1951). He had a bigger part in a Tim Holt Western, Overland Telegraph (1951), and a drama, Monsoon (1952). He was going to star in a film called GI Smith, but production was canceled. He had unbilled bit roles in the studio films Phone Call from a Stranger (1951) and Down Among the Sheltering Palms (1952).

Leading man
Nader's first starring role was in Robot Monster (1953), a 3-D feature film directed by Phil Tucker. Although the film is remembered primarily for its "camp" attributes as "one of the worst films ever made,” it was financially successful and led to more prominent roles for Nader in other films. He supported Paulette Goddard in Sins of Jezebel (1953) and had a supporting role in Carnival Story (1954). He was the male love interest for Miss Robin Crusoe (1954) at Fox.

Meanwhile, Nader appeared regularly on TV shows such as Schlitz Playhouse of Stars, Hallmark Hall of Fame, Letter to Loretta, Cavalcade of America, Lux Video Theatre, and The Pepsi-Cola Playhouse.

Universal Pictures
He made a number of films for Universal Studios, alongside leading men such as Rock Hudson, Tony Curtis, and Jeff Chandler. His first film for Universal was a Western, Four Guns to the Border (1954), wherein he was billed beneath Rory Calhoun and Colleen Miller. He followed it with Six Bridges to Cross (1955), supporting Tony Curtis and Julie Adams in a role that Chandler had refused.

Nader was promoted to lead in The Second Greatest Sex (1955) opposite Jeanne Crain and in Lady Godiva of Coventry (1955) opposite Maureen O'Hara, stepping in for Chandler again. In 1955, he won a Golden Globe Award for "Most Promising Newcomer."

He starred opposite Virginia Mayo in Congo Crossing (1956) and was second-billed to Chandler in Universal's expensive war epic Away All Boats (1956). He was Esther Williams's leading man in The Unguarded Moment (1956), which starred a young John Saxon. He had top billing in Four Girls in Town (1957) and Man Afraid (1957). Nader supported Audie Murphy in Joe Butterfly (1957), a military comedy. He had the lead in Appointment with a Shadow (1958) and Flood Tide (1958). He was Hedy Lamarr's love interest in The Female Animal (1958), replacing John Gavin. He had the starring role in Nowhere to Go, a 1958 British crime drama featuring the screen debut of Maggie Smith.

Television
Nader moved into regular television roles in the late 1950s, appearing in several short-lived series, including The Further Adventures of Ellery Queen (1959) and The Man and the Challenge (1959–60). In 1961, he appeared in an Alfred Hitchcock Presents episode "Self Defense,” with Audrey Totter; the following year, he returned for the "Where Beauty Lies" episode opposite Cloris Leachman. In the 1961–62 season, he appeared as insurance investigator Joe Shannon in the syndicated crime drama Shannon, co-starring with Regis Toomey.

Nader appeared frequently on The Loretta Young Show, a dramatic anthology series on NBC.

He produced and directed Walk by the Sea (1963).

International 
Nader had the title role in a European swashbuckler, The Secret Mark of D'Artagnan (1963). He made Zigzag (1963) and The Great Space Adventure (1964) for Albert Zugsmith; both films were made in the Philippines. He starred in The Human Duplicators (1965) and regularly guest-starred on TV shows.

Nader went to Germany to star as FBI agent Jerry Cotton in the German film Tread Softly (1965). It was a hit and led to a series of films: Manhattan Night of Murder (1965), Tip Not Included (1966), The Trap Snaps Shut at Midnight (1966), Murderers Club of Brooklyn (1967), Death in the Red Jaguar (1968), Death and Diamonds (1968), and Dead Body on Broadway (1969).

He appeared in two Harry Alan Towers productions, The Million Eyes of Sumuru (1967) shot in Hong Kong and The House of 1,000 Dolls (1967) filmed in Spain. One of his last films was Beyond Atlantis (1973), made in the Philippines.

Writing
In the 1970s, Nader suffered an eye injury in an automobile accident, which made him particularly sensitive to the bright lights of movie sets and forced him to retire from acting. He began writing, including his 1978 science fiction novel Chrome, which dealt with a forbidden romance between a man and an android (also male).

According to Variety's Army Archerd, Nader had completed a book called The Perils of Paul (the title being a play on the melodrama serial The Perils of Pauline) about the gay community in Hollywood, which he did not want published until after his death.

Personal life

Although Nader was not openly gay during his film career, he generally did not feign relationships with women to conceal it, instead deflecting questions by saying that he had not met "the right one.”

Nader lived with his life partner, Mark Miller (November 22, 1926 – June 9, 2015), whom he met in 1947 while they were acting in a play together.

Miller worked as Rock Hudson's personal secretary from 1972 until the star's death, and the couple inherited the interest from Hudson's $27 million estate after his death from AIDS complications in 1985. Hudson biographer Sara Davidson described Nader, Miller, and another person as "Rock's family for most of his adult life." Nader publicly acknowledged his sexual orientation shortly afterward.

Nader and Miller eventually settled in Palm Springs.

Stricken by multiple medical problems, Nader entered the hospital in September 2001. He died on February 4, 2002, in Woodland Hills, California, of cardiopulmonary failure, pneumonia, and multiple cerebral infarctions. He was survived by Miller (with whom he had spent 55 years), his cousins Sally Kubly and Roberta Cavell, and his nephew, actor Michael Nader. His ashes were scattered at sea; a cenotaph in his honor, together with Mark Miller and Rock Hudson, exists in Cathedral City's Forest Lawn Cemetery. In 2002, a Golden Palm Star on the Palm Springs, California, Walk of Stars was dedicated to him.

Filmography

References

External links

 
 George Nader at Mystery Science Theatre 3000
 George Nader on glbtq.com
 

1921 births
2002 deaths
20th-century American novelists
American male film actors
American male novelists
American male television actors
Burials at Forest Lawn Cemetery (Cathedral City)
American gay actors
Deaths from pneumonia in California
American LGBT novelists
LGBT people from California
Male actors from Pasadena, California
Occidental College alumni
20th-century American male writers
20th-century American male actors
New Star of the Year (Actor) Golden Globe winners
United States Navy personnel of World War II
20th-century LGBT people